Kimberly S. Myers is an American television and film actress.

Her breakthrough role was in the 1985 horror film A Nightmare on Elm Street 2: Freddy's Revenge as Lisa Webber. She acted in another horror sequel in 1996, Hellraiser: Bloodline.

Filmography

Film

Television

References

External links

American film actresses
American television actresses
Living people
Actresses from Los Angeles
20th-century American actresses
21st-century American actresses
Year of birth missing (living people)